tazur Company  is a Bahraini closed joint stock company incorporated under the laws of the Kingdom of Bahrain and licensed and regulated by the Central Bank of Bahrain.

The company was founded by Bank Al Khair with an authorised capital of US$500,000,000, of which US$58,000,000 is issued and paid up.

The company provides Family and General Takaful products for individuals and businesses. All products abide by the principles of the Islamic law and are under the supervision of the company's Sharia Supervisory Board.

Business Scope

The company offers a full range of Family and General Islamic Insurance products for both individual and corporate clients.

Geographical Territories

 Bahrain
 Kuwait
 Qatar

Shari’a Supervisory Board

 Dr. Abdul Sattar Abu Ghuddah Chairman
 Dr. Ali Muhyealdin Al QurraDaghi Vice Chairman
 Sheikh Nizam Mohammed Saleh Yaqoubi Member

Awards

References

External links
 Official website

Investment companies of Bahrain
Companies based in Manama